Berndt Ivegren (21 September 1923 – 11 September 2009) was a Swedish footballer. He played in Allsvenskan for Djurgården

Career
Ivegren, born 21 September 1923, represented Värtan and Djurgården. He made 88 Allsvenskan appearances for Djurgården and scored 0 goals.

He made his international debut for Sweden on 2 September 1951 against Sweden after having made 2 appearances for the national B team of Sweden in 1950.

Ivegren died 11 September 2009 in Huddinge.

References

Swedish footballers
Värtans IK players
Djurgårdens IF Fotboll players
1923 births
2009 deaths
Association footballers not categorized by position